Rachel Corboz (born May 1, 1996)  is a French-American professional soccer player who plays as a midfielder for Stade de Reims.

Early life
Born to French-born parents, Michel and Christine, Corboz has a dual citizenship with France. She was born in Mobile, Alabama, where her father, a former semi-professional player in Grenoble, was pursuing his postdoctoral research at the University of South Alabama. Her mother is an accountant. She grew up in Green Brook Township, New Jersey and attended the Pingry School. Her brother, Mael played soccer for Rutgers before transferring to Maryland, and her older sister Daphne, who is three years her senior, was her teammate both at Georgetown and now at FC Fleury.

College career
Corboz had a four-year career with the Georgetown University women's soccer team where she scored 34 goals in 88 appearances. Her freshman year she was named to the All-Big East Second team and Rookie team selection. She followed this her sophomore year by being named to the All-Big East First team, All-Big East Academic All-Star and Big East Midfielder of the Year. She again was named to the All-Big East First team in her junior year and was named to the NSCAA All-American First team and a semifinalist for the MAC Herman Trophy. She was again named and All-American, MAC Herman semifinalist and Big East Midfielder of the Year her senior year.

Club career
After being a late addition to the 2018 NWSL College Draft, Corboz went undrafted. She was however called in to preseason camp by the Reign FC as a discovery player.

FC Fleury 91
Corboz signed for FC Fleury on June 16, 2018.  In her first season with the club she made 19 appearances.

Stade de Reims
In 2019, Corboz signs for Stade de Reims. She's named the team's captain at the beginning of the 2021-2022's season.

International career
Corboz has been previously selected to train with the United States U-18 and United States U-20.

References

External links
 Georgetown profile
 
Twitter
Instagram

1996 births
Living people
Sportspeople from Mobile, Alabama
Soccer players from Alabama
American women's soccer players
American people of French descent
Soccer players from New Jersey
People from Green Brook Township, New Jersey
Pingry School alumni
Sportspeople from Somerset County, New Jersey
Georgetown Hoyas women's soccer players
American expatriate women's soccer players
Women's association football midfielders
Division 1 Féminine players
Stade de Reims Féminines players